Yury Zyabrev (2 April 1947 – 11 November 2006) was a Soviet equestrian. He competed in the team jumping event at the 1972 Summer Olympics.

References

External links

1947 births
2006 deaths
Soviet male equestrians
Olympic equestrians of the Soviet Union
Equestrians at the 1972 Summer Olympics
Place of birth missing